A foreign fighter is someone who travels abroad to participate in a non-international armed conflict or fight for a country of which he or she is not a national.

See also
French Foreign Legion
Spanish Foreign Legion
International response to the Spanish Civil War
International Brigades
Foreign support of Finland in the Winter War
Mahal (Israel)
Waffen-SS foreign volunteers and conscripts
Foreign volunteers in the Rhodesian Security Forces
Foreign fighters in the Croatian War of Independence
Foreign fighters in the Bosnian War
Foreign fighters in the Syrian Civil War and War in Iraq
Foreign fighters in the Russo-Ukrainian War
Ukrainian volunteer battalions
Controversy surrounding Swedish jihadist foreign fighters
Final Report of the Task Force on Combating Terrorist and Foreign Fighter Travel
List of foreign volunteers

References

Expatriate military units and formations